Sadan Rostaq may refer to:
Sadan Rostaq-e Gharbi Rural District
Sadan Rostaq-e Sharqi Rural District